Hareendranath Dwarak Warrier (Malayalam:ഹരീന്ദ്രനാഥ് ദ്വാരക് വാര്യർ ), better known as Dwarak Warrier  is an Indian Sound Designer and Sound Mixer. He has worked in Hindi, Malayalam, and French cinemas.

Biography

Dwarak Warrier, who hails from Thiruvananthapuram, is a 1992 graduate from Film and Television Institute of India, Pune. He is known for his association with director Ram Gopal Varma.  He is currently working as Content Services Engineer at Dolby Laboratories.

Filmography

Feature films

Short films

Documentaries

Awards

Filmfare Awards
 2004 – Best Sound Design – Bhoot
 2005 – Best Sound Design – Dhoom
 2008 – Best Sound Design – Johnny Gaddaar

Screen Awards
 2002 – Best Sound Design – Company
 2004 – Best Sound Design – Bhoot

Zee Cine Awards
 2004 – Best Audiography – Bhoot

Bollywood Movie Awards
 2004 – Best Sound Design – Dhoom 2

Indian Documentary Producer’s Association Awards
 2006 – Best Sound Design – Riding Solo to the Top of the World

Sansui Viewer’s Choice Movie Awards
 2004 – Best Sound Design – Bhoot

Star Guild Awards
 2004 – Best Sound Recording – Bhoot

References

External links
 
Hareendranath Dwarak at graftii.org
Resounding Success at thehindu.com
Dwarak Warrier at bollywoodmdb.com
 at fandango.com
Dwarak Warrier at dirttrackproductions.com
"Dwarak Warrier" at moviebuff.com

Living people
Film musicians from Kerala
Musicians from Thiruvananthapuram
Indian sound designers
Film and Television Institute of India alumni
Year of birth missing (living people)
21st-century Indian musicians